Miwa Tanaka (born 24 June 1998) is a Japanese professional footballer who plays as a midfielder for WE League club Albirex Niigata Ladies.

Club career 
Tanaka made her WE League debut on 31 October 2021.

References 

Living people
1998 births
Women's association football midfielders
WE League players
Japanese women's footballers
Association football people from Kagoshima Prefecture
Albirex Niigata Ladies players